Phyllomedusa chaparroi is a species of treefrog in the subfamily Phyllomedusinae endemic to Peru.  Scientists have only seen it in two places.

The adult male frog measures approximately 67.9 to 77.5 mm long in snout-vent length.  This frog resembles Phyllomedusa camba very closely but the two species can be distinguished in nuclear and mitochondrial markers.

The iris of the eye is red-brown in color with tiny, indistinct orange spots.

References

Endemic fauna of Peru
Frogs of South America
Amphibians described in 2017
chaparroi